Karakaş is a Turkish word meaning "black eye brow") It may refer to:

Surname
Karakaş
 Ayşe Işıl Karakaş (born 1958), Turkish professor of law and international judge
 Cahit Karakaş (born 1928), Turkish engineer and a former politician
 Cem Karakaş (born 1974), Turkish business executive
 İlker Karakaş (born 1999), Turkis footballer
 Kıvanç Karakaş (born 1985), Turkish footballer

Karakas
 Éva Karakas (1922–1995), Hungarian female chess grandmaster
 Hedvig Karakas (born 1990), Hungarian female judoka
 Mike Karakas (1911–1992), American ice hockey goaltender in the NHL

Karakasheva
 Mariya Karakasheva (born 1988), Bulgarian female volleyball player

Karakashian
 Narine Karakashian (born 1971), Armenian female chess player
 Verkine Karakashian (1856–1933), Ottoman-Armenian stage actress
 Yeranuhi Karakashian (1848-19244), Ottoman-Armenian stage actress

Karakashyan
 Nonna Karakashyan (born 1940), Armenian female chess player

Places
 Karakashly, a village in the Salyan Rayon of Azerbaijan.
 Karakaş, Arıcak
 Karakaş, Baskil
 Karakaş, Yığılca

Turkish-language surnames